The wazir or vazir is a fairy chess piece that may move a single square vertically or horizontally. In notation, it is given the symbol W. In this article, the wazir is represented by an inverted rook.

Name etymology
The name wazīr (vazir) (Arabic/Persian: وزير from Middle Persian vichir) means "minister" in several West and South Asian languages and is found in English as vizier. Wazīr (Vazir) is also the name of the queen in Arabic, Persian, and Hindi.

History and nomenclature
The wazir is a very old piece, appearing in some very early chess variants, such as Tamerlane chess. The wazir also appears in some historical large shogi variants, such as in dai shogi under the name angry boar (嗔猪 shinchō). The general in xiangqi moves like a wazir but may not leave its palace or end its turn in check.

Value

The wazir by itself is not much more powerful than a pawn, but as an additional power to other pieces, it is worth about half a knight. Three wazirs and a king can force checkmate on a bare king, but not easily; two wazirs and a king can force stalemate on a bare king, but not easily. The endgame of rook versus wazir is a win for the rook except in two drawing fortress positions for the wazir. The ferz, despite being , is more powerful than the wazir in the opening phase of the game due to its larger mobility forward. A wazir and a ferz cannot force checkmate on a bare king unless the bare king is significantly close to a corner that is the same color as the square of the ferz, but the combination of a knight and a wazir, that of a camel and a wazir, and that of a giraffe (the (1,4)-leaper) and a wazir can usually do so. 4.29% of the positions with knight and wazir against the bare king are fortress draws.

References
 Endgame statistics with fantasy pieces by Dave McCooey, The Chess Variant Pages

External links
 The Wazir by Ralph Betza, The Chess Variant Pages
 Piececlopedia: Wazir by Hans Bodlaender and Alberto Monteiroat, The Chess Variant Pages

Fairy chess pieces